Alpha MOS (NYSE Euronext, A) is a company which designs and manufactures analytical instruments for chemical and sensory analysis, and more particularly odor, taste and visual analysis.
The Company was created in 1993. It is headquartered in Toulouse, France and owns three subsidiaries in Hanover (USA), Tokyo (Japan) and Shanghai (China).
Alpha MOS Electronic Nose, Electronic Tongue and Electronic Eye have various applications in Food and Beverage mainly, Packaging, Environment, Pharmaceutical Industry, Cosmetics, Chemicals and Petrochemicals.

Products

HERACLES Electronic Noses allows global analysis of odors and volatile compounds generated by liquid, gas or solid samples. They use ultra fast gas chromatography technologies.

ASTREE Electronic Tongue can characterize the full taste of liquids or solids dissolved in liquids.

IRIS Electronic Eye achieves advanced visual analysis of the overall product or focused portions based on colors and shapes. It uses high resolution imaging.

All the instruments are coupled with multivariate statistics data processing.

Range of applications

Sensory analysis instruments are used by different departments: Quality Assurance (QA) and Quality Control (QC), Research & Development (R&D), and Process & Production for various purposes:

In Quality Assurance and Quality Control for:
 Conformity of raw materials, intermediate and final products
 Batch to batch consistency
 Detection of contamination, spoilage or adulteration
 Monitoring of storage conditions...

In R&D for:
 Formulation or reformulation of products
 Benchmarking with competitive products
 Shelf life and stability studies
 Selection of raw materials from different suppliers
 Packaging interaction effects
 Simplification of consumer preference test...

In Process and Production departments for:
 Managing raw material variability
 Comparison with a reference product
 Measurement and comparison of the effects of manufacturing process on products
 Following-up cleaning in place process efficiency
 Scale-up monitoring
 Cleaning in place monitoring.

References

External links
 Alpha MOS Website
 "The Electronic Nose: Artificial Olfaction Technology" by Himanshu K. Patel
 "Rapid direct analysis to discriminate geographic origin of extra virgin olive oils by flash gas chromatography electronic nose and chemometrics", Melucci D, 2016.
 Masking of bitterness in dairy protein hydrolysates: Comparison of an electronic tongue and a trained sensory panel as means of directing the masking strategy Author links open overlay panel, J.Newman, 2015
 Alpha MOS on ActusNews
 Alpha MOS on LinkedIn
 Alpha MOS launches powerful fast GC Electronic Nose with chemical and sensory characterization module
 Food Product Development and QC Using E-Nose and E-Tongue Analyzers

Technology companies established in 1993
Technology companies of France